Michael Toner (born 1944) is a British journalist. He was political editor, diplomatic correspondent and leader writer at the Sunday Express, chief leader writer on the Daily Mail until 2006, a political author and novelist.

Life and career
Toner was born in Bedfordshire in 1944 and educated at Bedford Modern School and the University of Cambridge. He began his career in journalism at the Stoke Sentinel before moving to the Sunday Express where, in 1981, he interviewed Margaret Thatcher with fellow Express journalist Keith Renshaw. He became leader writer of the Sunday Express where he covered many of the controversial topics of the 1980s and 1990s including articles about the IRA, Britain Fumes at US Over I.R.A. Guns, the miners' strike, the Falklands War, child abuse and the war crime allegations involving Kurt Waldheim. David Alton described Toner's approach to Alton's anti-abortion bill as "thorough and fair".

Following his period at the Sunday Express, Toner became Chief Leader Writer at the Daily Mail, a position he held until 2006 when Tom Utley succeeded him to the role.

Toner's first published work, The Bluffer's Guide To The EU, has run to several editions encapsulating the changing nomenclature of that institution. He published his first novel, Seeing the Light, in 1997.

Works
 Seeing the Light.  Published by Simon & Schuster, London, 1997
 The Bluffer's Guide To The EU.  Michael Toner with Christopher White and Lee Rotherham.  Published by Oval, London, 1999
 Bluff Your Way in the City

References

External links
 
 

1944 births
Living people
British journalists
20th-century British novelists
21st-century British novelists
People educated at Bedford Modern School